Gert Haller (30 April 1944, in Tübingen – 11 April 2010, in Bremen) was a German manager, politician and lobbyist of the Austrian financial group Wüstenrot & Württembergische AG. He died after a short serious illness aged 65.

References

1944 births
2010 deaths
Businesspeople from Baden-Württemberg
German lobbyists
German politicians
Commanders Crosses of the Order of Merit of the Federal Republic of Germany